For the Arab Hutaymi tribe, see Sulluba

The Sullubawa are a Fulani clan that historically featured prominently in the Fulani War which founded the Sokoto Caliphate. The ruling dynastic houses of Kano Emirate and Katsina Emirate; as well as the Ringim Emirate and Karaye Emirate belong to the clan and another amongst the four ruling Houses of Zazzau Emirate. They are also found in Kano, Jigawa, Katsina and Sokoto states. 

The ancestral origin of the Sullubawa is bilād as-sūdān (بلاد السودان)  (Sullubawa in Hausa, Sullpe in Fulani language) are the descendants of Ahmed Bah باه  (one of the  four of Oquba Bin Nafah Alfehri الفهري عقبة بن نافع  offspring and the two thousand soldiers (Faman settled in Silla) at Niger river have intermarriage with  native residents they are distributed into 18 tribes some of them are: Yallabi يلبي Wlrapi ولربي Sall سال Sullupe  Sullubawaسولوبي , Tarnapi تانرابي  Oranbi, wallabi and 80 branches  related to them.

Sullupi سل , سلب  سلسلب  of Fulani clan emigrated from Tur Sinai طور سيناء the coted name for Futa Toro  فوتا تورو ,which some Fulani  tribe tale believe that were they migrated from to Hausa Land and then settled in Gerderga قيدقند between Jammalwal جماألوال and Ged  (south Niger & North Nigeria) and their clan title were (Bah) به باه  .
Fulani Sullupi were existed in Macina ماسينا territory with their cattle cows long before the arrival of shake شيخ   Ahmed Lobo.

They are the main branches of El-Faman ancestors of the Red Fulani of Western Sudan that white army who came from North Africa and settled in Silla since 739 A.D.

They are said to have originated from Futa Toro, in what is now Senegal, and are cousins with the Torodbe (Toronkawa) from Sissilo, the husband of Cippowo, a sister of Uthman Toroddo ancestor of Usman dan Fodio. 

Sullubawa fought against the Hausa kingdoms in the jihad led by Usman dan Fodio. They became "hereditary beneficiaries of all positions of authority in all but one Hausa state". The clan controlled many of the fiefdoms of the Kano Emirate in the 19th century. They benefitted from British colonization and indirect rule which saw their influence increase. The Sullubawa later attained positions of power following independence; with one of them Umaru Musa Yar'Adua becoming President of Nigeria.

Notable Sullubawas 
Ibrahim Dabo - Emir of Kano (1819–46)
Sarkin Zazzau Abdulsalam - Emir of Zazzau (1853–1863)
Muhammadu Dikko - Emir of Katsina (1906–44)
Usman Nagogo - Emir of Katsina (1944–81)
Muhammadu Sanusi I - Emir of Kano (1953–1963)
Ado Bayero - Emir of Kano (1963–2014)
Musa Yar'Adua - Minister of Lagos Affairs (First Republic) and Matawalle of Katsina
Hassan Katsina - Chief of Army Staff (1966–67), and Governor of Northern Nigeria (1966–67)
Muhammadu Dikko Yusufu - Inspector General of Police (1975–1979)
 Sayyadi Abubakar Mahmoud Usman- Emir of Ringim, Jigawa State
Shehu Musa Yar'Adua - Chief of Staff, Supreme Headquarters (1976–1979)
Mohammed Bello - Chief Justice of Nigeria (1987–1995)
Sanusi Ado Bayero - Chiroma of Kano (1990–2015), Managing Director of the Nigerian Ports Authority (2015) and Wamban of Kano (2020–present)
Tijjani Hashim - Galadima of Kano (1993–2014)
Umaru Musa Yar'Adua - Governor of Katsina State (1999–2007), President of Nigeria (2007–2010), and Matawalle of Katsina.
Abdullahi Dikko -  Comptroller-General of Customs (2009–2015)
Muhammadu Sanusi II - Governor of the Central Bank of Nigeria (2009–2014), and Emir of Kano (2014–2020)
Hadiza Bala Usman - Managing Director of the Nigerian Ports Authority (2016–2021)
Aminu Ado Bayero - Emir of Kano (2020–present)
Abba Kabir Yusuf - Politician

See also 

Fula jihads
Dambazawa
Jobawa

References

History of Nigeria
Kano State